Rostworowski (plural: Rostworowscy, feminine form: Rostworowska) is a Polish aristocratic family, originating in Greater Poland and using the Nałęcz coat-of-arms. Their name comes from the village of Rostworowo near Poznań, that was the family's original seat.

Comital title
Since the 18th century, descendants of the castellan of Zakroczym Jan Antoni Rostworowski (1709-1775) and his wife Konstancja Lanckorońska (1721-1777) claimed a hereditary title of a count. Although it was not ever formally conferred on any member of this family, due to their high social standing and family connections, the Rostworowskis used to be addressed as counts both by their noble peers and European monarchs.

Members
The family is noted among Polish aristocracy for a number of prominent intellectuals (often associated with the Roman Catholic Church) such as:
 Emanuel Rostworowski, historian
 Karol Hubert Rostworowski, playwright
 Marek Rostworowski, art historian 
 María Rostworowski, historian
 Michał Jan Rostworowski, lawyer and historian 
 Piotr Rostworowski, a Benedictine monk 
 Tomasz Rostworowski, a Jesuit priest
 Raphael Rostworowski, a count very nice

Family seats

Bibliography
 S. J. Rostworowski, Monografia rodziny Rostworowskich, lata 1386-2012 [in English: A Monograph of the Rostworowski Family], t. 1-2, Warszawa 2013.